Pauls Valley is a city in and the county seat of Garvin County, Oklahoma, United States. The population was 5,992 at the 2020 census, a decline of 3.2 percent from the figure of 6,187 in 2010. It was settled by and named for Smith Paul, a North Carolina native who married a Chickasaw woman and became a citizen of the Chickasaw Nation before the Civil War. The town economy is largely based on agriculture and oil production.

History
The area that eventually became the city of Pauls Valley was one of the earliest European-American settlements in what was then known as Indian Territory. Smith Paul, born in 1809 in New Bern, North Carolina, discovered the fertile bottom land which is now Pauls Valley while a member of a wagon train traveling to California. Paul described the land as "a section where the bottom land was rich and blue stem grass grew so high that a man on horseback was almost hidden in its foliage."

The Tri-Party Treaty of January 1, 1837, ceded this part of what is now the State of Oklahoma to the Chickasaw Nation. When the Chickasaw people were relocated to Indian Territory that year, Smith Paul moved with them and married Ela-Teecha, a Chickasaw woman. In 1847, the Pauls established a plantation on the rich Garvin County bottom land, where Rush Creek joined the Washita River, which became known to locals as "Smith Paul's Valley". Mail to the Pauls was often addressed to "Smith Paul's Large Farm". By 1871, postal service was established in the area, although the post office was designated "Paul's Valley, Arkansas", because the Indian Territory was being administered out of Arkansas at that time.

The Atchison, Topeka and Santa Fe Railway (a.k.a. Santa Fe Railway) shortened the name to "Paul's Valley" when it built a track through the community in 1887, completing its connection between Kansas and the Gulf Coast. The railroad brought growth and prosperity to Smith Paul's Valley. The first newspaper was published in 1887. The Pauls Valley town site was laid out in 1892, though the plat was not approved by the Dawes Commission until 1903.

At the time of its founding, Pauls Valley was located in Pickens County, Chickasaw Nation.

A U.S. courthouse was built in 1895. The first white school in Indian Territory was established, and brick buildings were built downtown. In 1909, the streets were bricked. Today, Pauls Valley has more brick streets——than any other town in the United States.

From 1948–1954, Pauls Valley was home to the Pauls Valley Raiders,  a minor league baseball team. The Pauls Valley Raiders were a member of the Class D Sooner State League and an affiliate of the New York Giants (1952–1953). The Pauls Valley Raiders played at Wacker Park.

When the Santa Fe Railway discontinued its Lone Star route in 1979, the 1905 building fell into disuse. By 1985, the BNSF Railway (which had bought the Santa Fe Railway, had obtained a permit to raze the old depot. Adrienne Grimmet, who was then president of the Pauls Valley Historical Society, started a campaign to save the old structure. Her efforts resulted in the city buying the depot from BNSF and turning it over to the historical society for conversion into a museum. Individuals donated their time and skills, and local businesses either donated or discounted the cost of materials to perform the necessary renovations, which began in 1991.

In 1999, Amtrak began its Heartland Flyer service between Oklahoma City and Fort Worth, passing through Pauls Valley. City officials agreed to build a new waiting room for Amtrak passengers adjacent to the old depot. The new Pauls Valley station has a climate-controlled waiting area and restrooms, but is unstaffed, having no ticketing or baggage handling facilities. It also has a 10-car parking lot outside. The architecture was designed to be compatible with the old Santa Fe-style building.

The Oklahoma Cartoonists Hall of Fame, located in the Toy and Action Figure Museum, was opened in Pauls Valley in 2005.

Geography
Pauls Valley is located east of the center of Garvin County at  (34.735831, -97.223503).

The Washita River, a tributary of the Red River, flows through the city north of the downtown area.

Demographics

As of the census of 2000, there were over 6,000 people, 2,475 households, and 1,591 families residing in the city. The racial makeup of the city was 79.27% White, 5.29% African American, 7.40% Native American, 0.66% Asian, 0.06% Pacific Islander, 3.47% from other races, and 3.85% from two or more races. Hispanic or Latino of any race were 7.53% of the population.

There were 2,475 households, out of which 30.5% had children under the age of 18 living with them, 46.6% were married couples living together, 14.1% had a female householder with no husband present, and 35.7% were non-families. 32.0% of all households were made up of individuals, and 17.4% had someone living alone who was 65 years of age or older. The average household size was 2.38 and the average family size was 3.00.

In the city, the population was spread out, with 24.4% under the age of 18, 9.2% from 18 to 24, 27.1% from 25 to 44, 20.6% from 45 to 64, and 18.7% who were 65 years of age or older. The median age was 38 years. For every 100 females, there were 88.5 males. For every 100 females age 18 and over, there were 84.6 males.

The median income for a household in the city was $26,654, and the median income for a family was $32,348. Males had a median income of $27,014 versus $18,965 for females. The per capita income for the city was $15,553. About 12.9% of families and 20.7% of the population were below the poverty line, including 23.0% of those under age 18 and 17.7% of those age 65 or over.

Economy
Agricultural is the primary economic activity in the Pauls Valley area. Corn, wheat, hay, and cotton have been grown successfully in the region, and cattle production is a major activity. Petroleum industry services is the second largest activity in the region. The nearby Golden Trend oil and gas field is still one of the major producing fields in Oklahoma.  In more recent years, the town has attracted some light manufacturing plants such as plastics products.

Established in 1921, the Pauls Valley Chamber of Commerce is today a 200-member business association with the mission of advancing the commercial, industrial, educational, civic, general business and cultural climate of Pauls Valley. It is a partner with businesses active on the I-35 corridor of central Oklahoma. Pauls Valley is located on Exits 70 and 72.

Major employers include Walmart Distribution Center, Walmart Supercenter, Pauls Valley Public Schools, Amor Flexibles North America, Seth Wadley Auto Group, Covercraft, Garvin County Community Living Center, and the City of Pauls Valley. Pauls Valley is also the home of the world famous Field's Pies, which are sold in grocery stores across Oklahoma and surrounding states.

Education
Pauls Valley Public Schools provides basic education through high school for Pauls Valley.

Public schools:
 Pauls Valley High School
 Pauls Valley Junior High School
 Pauls Valley Elementary School
 Pauls Valley Intermediate School

Transportation

Railroad
The Pauls Valley station is one of only five Amtrak passenger stations still operating in Oklahoma. It shares property with the railroad station that was originally built by the Santa Fe Railroad in 1905. The Amtrak facility handles two trains per day (the Heartland Flyer). Amtrak does not provide either ticketing or baggage services at this station.

Air
The street address is 500 Airport Road. The airport is open Monday through Friday between 8:00 AM and 5:00 PM Central Time.

Bus
 Greyhound Lines
 Delta Public Transit

Notable people
 Clifford Cleveland Brooks (1886–1944), Georgia native, sold real estate in Pauls Valley c. 1910; member of the Louisiana State Senate from 1924 to 1932 from northeast delta parishes 
 Roger Eason (1918–1998), National Football League player, born in Pauls Valley
Joseph Glasco (1925–1996), abstract expressionist painter and sculptor
 Jennings Poindexter (1910–1983), Major League Baseball pitcher, born in Pauls Valley
 T. J. Rushing (born 1983), National Football League player, born in Pauls Valley
 Jean Shepard (1933–2016), singer and songwriter, born in Pauls Valley (birth name Ollie Imogene Shepherd)
 G. D. Spradlin (1920–2011), movie and TV actor, born in Pauls Valley
 Ben T. Williams (1910–1982), Oklahoma Supreme Court justice (1953–1982)
 Alma Wilson (1917–1999), first female appointed to serve as an Oklahoma Supreme Court justice and later the first female chief justice of the Oklahoma Supreme Court (1982–1997)

Notes

References

External links
 City of Pauls Valley official website
Pauls Valley Chamber of Commerce 
 The Toy and Action Figure Museum

Cities in Garvin County, Oklahoma
Cities in Oklahoma
County seats in Oklahoma
Populated places established in 1871
1871 establishments in Indian Territory